Ricardo Costa (25 January 1940 – 8 July 2021) was a Portuguese film director. He wrote texts on cinema, vision, and language.

Works
Costa's works were primarily composed of documentaries, many of them containing elements of fiction. He used direct cinema as a tool for salvage ethnography. His film, was displayed at the 60th Venice International Film Festival in 2003. It was released at the Quad Cinema in New York City in April 2011. His film, was released in 2016, followed by Cliffs in 2017.

Biography
Costa studied at the University of Lisbon, where he obtained a doctorate in literature in 1969 after defending a thesis on the works of Franz Kafka. He worked as a high school teacher and editor of sociological books. Following the Carnation Revolution, he became a professional film director and producer. He was a partner in the GRUPO ZERO alongside João César Monteiro, Jorge Silva Melo, Alberto Seixas Santos, and others. The group organized cinematic screenings in Paris at the Cinémathèque Française.

Death
Ricardo Costa died on 8 July 2021 at the age of 81.

Writings

Articles

In Portuguese
"O olhar antes do cinema" (1982)
"A outra face do espelho" (2000)
"Jean Rouch do avesso" (2017)

In English
"Having to create" (2019)
"Having to be" (2019)
"Having to see" (2019)
"Having to do" (2020)
"Lecture"

Essays

In Portuguese
Os olhos e o cinema (1997)
Olhos no ecrã (2000)
Os olhos da ideia (2002)

In English
Happiness from the past to the future (2020)

Filmography

Feature films
 (1975)
 (1975)
 (1976)
Abril no Minho (1978)
 (1979)
 (1979)
 (1980)
 (1981)
 (1981)
 (1983)
 (1985)
Paroles (1998)
Mists (2003)
Drifts (2016)
Cliffs (2017)

Short and medium-length films
 (1974)
 (1974)
 (1974)
 (1975)
 (1975)
O Arrasto (1975)
Oceanografia Biológica (1975)
Ti Zaragata e a Bateira (1975)
Pesca da Sardinha (1975)
Conchinha do Mar (1975)
Às Vezes Custa (1975)
A Sacada (1975)
Os Irmãos Severo e os Cem Polvos (1976)
 (1976)
A Colher (1976)
O Velho e o Novo (1976)
A Falta e a Fartura (1976)
Quem só muda de Camisa (1976)
A Máquina do Dinheiro (1976)
Viver do Mar (1976)
Uma Perdiz na Gaiola (1976)
Nas Voltas do Rio (1976)
O Submarino de Vidro (1976)
 (1976)
Das Ruínas do Império (1977)
E do Mar Nasceu (1977)
Música do Quotidiano (1978)
Abril no Minn (1978)
A Lampreia (1979)
A Coca (1979)
Histórias de Baçal (1979)
Esta aldeia, Rio de Onor (1979)
O Pisão (1979)
A Feira (1979)
O Outro Jogo (1979)
Joaquim da Loiça (1980)
Pastores da Serra da Estrela (1980)
Barcos de Peniche (1980)
O Parque Nacional de Montesinho (1980)
Lisboa e o Mar (1982)
GIG (2014)

External sources

References

1940 births
2021 deaths
Portuguese film directors
University of Lisbon alumni
People from Peniche, Portugal